The American Samoa national netball team represent American Samoa in international netball.

The team competed in the 2019 Pacific Games in Apia, but was eliminated in the early rounds.

Competitive history

References

National netball teams of Oceania
National sports teams of American Samoa